Dabrafenib, sold under the brand name Tafinlar among others, is an anti-cancer medication used for the treatment of cancers associated with a mutated version of the gene BRAF. Dabrafenib acts as an inhibitor of the associated enzyme B-Raf, which plays a role in the regulation of cell growth.

The most common side effects include papilloma (warts), headache, nausea, vomiting, hyperkeratosis (thickening and toughening of the skin), hair loss, rash, joint pain, fever and tiredness. When taken in combination with trametinib, the most common side effects include fever, tiredness, nausea, chills, headache, diarrhea, vomiting, joint pain and rash.

Medical uses 
Dabrafenib is indicated as a single agent for the treatment of people with unresectable or metastatic melanoma with BRAF V600E mutation. Dabrafenib is indicated, in combination with trametinib, for BRAF V600E-positive unresectable or metastatic melanoma, melanoma, metastatic non-small cell lung cancer, metastatic anaplastic thyroid cancer, and unresectable or metastatic solid tumors.

History 
Clinical trial data demonstrated that resistance to dabrafenib and other BRAF inhibitors occurs within six to seven months. To overcome this resistance, the BRAF inhibitor dabrafenib was combined with the MEK inhibitor trametinib. In January 2014, the FDA approved this combination of dabrafenib and trametinib for BRAF V600E/K-mutant metastatic melanoma. In May 2018, the FDA approved the combination dabrafenib/trametinib as an adjuvant treatment for BRAF V600E-mutated, stage III melanoma after surgical resection based on the results of the COMBI-AD phase 3 study, making it the first oral chemotherapy regimen that prevents cancer relapse for node positive, BRAF-mutated melanoma.

Society and culture

Legal status 
The US Food and Drug Administration initially approved dabrafenib as a single agent treatment for patients with BRAF V600E mutation-positive advanced melanoma in May 2013. Dabrafenib was approved for use in the European Union in August 2013.

In April 2017, the European Union approved the combination of dabrafenib with trametinib for BRAF V600-positive advanced or metastatic non small-cell lung cancer (NSCLC).

Research 
Dabrafenib has clinical activity with a manageable safety profile in clinical trials of phase 1 and 2 in patients with BRAF (V600)-mutated metastatic melanoma.

References

Further reading

External links
 

Aminopyrimidines
Chemotherapy
CYP3A4 inducers
Sulfonamides
Thiazoles
Organofluorides
B-Raf inhibitors
Tert-butyl compounds
Fluoroarenes
Novartis brands